The Americas Zone is one of the three zones of regional Davis Cup competition in 2010.

In the Americas Zone there are four different groups in which teams compete against each other to advance to the next group.

Participating teams

Seeds

Other nations

Draw

 relegated to Group II in 2011.
 and advance to World Group play-off.

First Round Matches

Dominican Republic vs. Uruguay

Second Round Matches

Brazil vs. Uruguay

Colombia vs. Canada

Second-round play-offs

Dominican Republic vs. Canada

References

External links
 Davis Cup draw details

1